Latefa Wiersch (*1982) is a visual artist, born in Dortmund, lives in Zurich. She works mostly with textile materials, creates sculptures, anthropomorphic objects, puppets, installations and performances.

Life 
Latefa Wiersch grew up in Dortmund, first studied Design at the Fachhochschule Bielefeld, later Fine Arts at the Berlin University of the Arts and earned a transdisciplinary Master's degree at the University of the Arts Bern.

Her work has received several awards: The "Kulturstiftung Sparkasse" scholarship in 2014;  the "Wilhelm Morgner Scholarship" in 2016; the "Preis des Kantons Zürich" in 2019; and in 2020 the "Zürcher Bildhauerstipendium" and the "Werkstipendium der Stadt Zürich". She was also nominated for the "Shizuko Yoshikawa Award" 2020 and the "Swiss Art Award" 2021. In 2022 she received the Swiss Performance Price.

Work 
In her works Latefa Wiersch uses mainly everyday materials, fabrics and creates objects and puppets from them, which are intended to make the livingness of things visible. Thus, the partly distorted physicality is emphasized. Mostly the installative works are accompanied by music, stop-motion videos or a theatrical use of light. The works are characterized by a sometimes whimsical humor. In her work Artpop-Insta the dolls appear as alter ego figures of the artist, giving insight into her fictional everyday life and also broadly addressing issues such as racism, tokenism and othering.

Exhibitions 
Selection:

 Original Features Kunsthaus Langenthal, solo exhibition, 2022.
 Neon Bush Girl Society. Schauspiel Dortmund, performance, 2022.
 The Puppet Show. Centre d'Art Contemporain Genève, 2022.
 Pulp. Black Future Month, Mouches Volantes Cologne, 2022.
 Exhibition. Swiss Art Awards Basel and Last Tango Zurich, 2021.
 Monsterhood Part II, Sennentuntschi, a cultural appropriation. Schauspiel Dortmund, performance, 2021.
 Ne Pas De Deux. Zentrum Paul Klee, performance together with Emma Murray, 2019.
 Artpop_Insta. Media art, ongoing series of works. Since 2018.
 Road Trip. Museum Wilhelm Morgner, Soest, solo exhibition, 2018.
 Pinocchio’s Wood and Four Other Lies. Kunstverein Unna, solo exhibition, 2016.
 Peepshow baggage claim. Kunsthaus Glarus, solo exhibition, 2015.
 The Creation of Man. Centre for International Light Art Unna, solo exhibition, 2014.

External links 

 Official homepage of Latefa Wiersch
 "Latefa Wiersch — Portrait and Editorial" in Kunstbulletin, November 2022.
 "The Puppet Show. Review", Flash Art, May 2022.
 "Les marionnettes envahissent le Centre d'art contemporain de Genève", RTS, April 2022
 "Digital art - Latefa Wiersch", Art Bulletin of July 2019

References 

Contemporary artists
1982 births
Living people
Swiss women artists